General Moore may refer to:

United Kingdom
Alexander George Montgomery Moore (1833–1919), British Army general
Arthur Thomas Moore (1830–1913), Bombay Army major general
Claude Moore (1875–1928), British Army major general
Jeremy Moore (1928–2007), Royal Marine major general
John Moore (British Army officer) (1761–1809), British Army lieutenant general
Rodney Moore (British Army officer) (1905–1985), British Army general
William Moore (British Army officer) (born 1958), British Army major general
Charles Moore, 1st Marquess of Drogheda (1730–1822), British Army general

United States
Andrew Moore (politician) (1752–1821), Virginia Militia major general
Bryant Moore (1894–1951), U.S. Army major general
C. D. Moore (born 1958), U.S. Air Force lieutenant general
Charles L. Moore (fl. 1980s–2020s), U.S. Air Force lieutenant general
George F. Moore (United States Army officer) (1887–1949), U.S. Army major general
Hal Moore (1922–2017), U.S. Army lieutenant general
J. Vreeland Moore (1824–1903), New Jersey Regiment brevet brigadier general in the American Civil War
James Moore (Continental Army officer) (c. 1737–c. 1777), Continental Army general
James T. Moore (USMC) (1895–1953), U.S. Marine Corps lieutenant general
James Edward Moore (1902–1986), U.S. Army four-star general
John Moore (physician) (1826–1907), Union Army brigadier general and Surgeon General of the Army
John Creed Moore (1824–1910), Confederate States Army brigadier general
Joseph Harold Moore (1914–2006), U.S. Air Force lieutenant general
Patrick Theodore Moore (1821–1883), Confederate States Army brigadier general
Richard G. Moore (fl. 1990s–2020s), U.S. Air Force major general
Robert Scurlark Moore (1895–1978), U.S. Army major general
Royal N. Moore Jr. (born 1935), U.S. Marine Corps major general
Samuel P. Moore (1813–1889), Confederate States Army brigadier general
Sydenham Moore (1817–1862), Alabama Militia brigadier general
Thomas Moore (South Carolina congressman) (1759–1822), U.S. Army brigadier general
Todd R. Moore (born c. 1974), U.S. Space Force brigadier general
William G. Moore Jr. (1920–2012), U.S. Air Force four-star general
William C. Moore (born 1929), U.S. Army major general

Other
Michael Moore (Swedish officer) (born 1953), Swedish Air Force major general
Newton Moore (1870–1936), Australian Imperial Forces major general

See also
John Moore-Bick (born 1949), British Army major general
Attorney General Moore (disambiguation)